Shock Treatment is a 1973 psychological horror thriller film directed by Alain Jessua. It was released in the United Kingdom by distributor Antony Balch as Doctor in the Nude.

Plot
Feeling at a dead end in life, Hélène Masson, the 38-year-old unmarried owner of a fashion business, books into the private clinic of Dr Devilers on the Brittany coast. Most of the workers, she notices, are unskilled Portuguese men who do not seem healthy, as they are prone to fainting. The clinic's regime for its wealthy clients, all regulars, is centred round fresh cell therapy. Her friend Jérôme, who recommended the place but can no longer afford the hefty fees, warns her that the injections are addictive. Next day he is found dead at the foot of the cliffs, an incident the police inspector considers suicide.

Hélène, who is not a woman to shut her eyes to suspicious faintings or to a suspicious death, starts her own investigating. As she talks Portuguese, she befriends Manoel, one of the unhappy employees, and going to his room finds him unconscious. Hiding behind a curtain, she sees doctors take a large amount of blood from him.

The young and charming Dr Devilers, aware of what she is up to, takes her to bed. Afterwards, while he is asleep, she roots through his files and discovers what she suspected. Attempting to leave, she finds her car sabotaged and the phone lines not working. Breaking into the laboratory, she finds Manoel's corpse partly harvested for serum. Devilers catches her there and, in a final confrontation that mirrors their earlier sexual bouts, she stabs him fatally.

The police inspector, a regular patient who hopes the clinic will be able continue as before, considers all her tales of horror to be the delusions of a disturbed woman and arrests her for murder.

Cast
 Annie Girardot as Hélène Masson
 Alain Delon as Dr Devilers
 Michel Duchaussoy as Dr Bernard
 Robert Hirsch as Jérôme Savignat
  as Camille Giovanelli
  as Me René Gassin
 Gabriel Cattand as Attorney De Boissière
 Robert Party as Colonel de Riberolles

Critical reception
TV Guide wrote that the film "starts off with some clever and suspenseful moments in a relatively good looking setting. However, the tension quickly degenerates. Some attempts at satirizing the affluent pay off but aren't new or terribly witty. Delon gives some energy to his part and Girardot works, but the film never quite comes together" ; while Time Out wrote, "Jessua handles his mixture of suspense and satire with assurance, drawing fine performances from Girardot, confused and finally uncertain of her sanity, and Delon as the diabolic yet half-sympathetic doctor in whose arms she finds herself. A neat cautionary tale on human vanity cum fable about hypocrisy."

References

External links
 
 
 
 

1973 horror films
1970s psychological horror films
1970s psychological thriller films
Films about immortality
Films set in Brittany
Films shot in France
French horror thriller films
French psychological horror films
French psychological thriller films
Italian horror thriller films
Italian psychological thriller films
Mad scientist films
1970s Italian films
1970s French films
French-language Italian films